Megachile ligniseca is a species of bee in the family Megachilidae. It was described by William Kirby in 1802.

References

Ligniseca
Insects described in 1802
Taxa named by William Kirby (entomologist)